Kye Stewart (born February 17, 1985) is a former Canadian football linebacker. He most recently played for the Saskatchewan Roughriders of the Canadian Football League. He was originally signed by the Roughriders as an undrafted free agent in 2009. He played college football at Illinois State.

External links
Saskatchewan Roughriders bio

1985 births
Living people
American players of Canadian football
Canadian football linebackers
Edmonton Elks players
Illinois State Redbirds football players
People from Nashville, Tennessee
Saskatchewan Roughriders players